Napoleon and the Little Washerwoman (German: Napoleon und die kleine Wäscherin) is a 1920 German silent historical comedy film directed by Adolf Gärtner and starring Ellen Richter, Rudolf Lettinger and Georg John. It is based on the 1893 play Madame Sans-Gêne by Victorien Sardou.

The film's sets were designed by the art director Hans Dreier.

Cast
 Ellen Richter as Madame Sans-Gêne 
 Rudolf Lettinger as Napoleon Bonaparte
 Georg John
 Friedrich Wilhelm Kaiser
 Ludwig Körner
 Hans Lindegg
 Henri Peters-Arnolds

References

Bibliography
 Holger Bachmann. Arthur Schnitzler und Michael Curtiz: Der junge Medardus auf der Bühne und im Kino. Verlag Die Blaue Eule, 2003.

External links

1920 films
Films of the Weimar Republic
Films directed by Adolf Gärtner
German silent feature films
UFA GmbH films
1920s historical comedy films
German historical comedy films
Depictions of Napoleon on film
German films based on plays
Films based on works by Victorien Sardou
German black-and-white films
1920 comedy films
Silent historical comedy films
1920s German films
1920s German-language films